Jyoti means "divine light" in many Indian languages.

Jyoti and variant spellings may refer to:

Films and TV
 Jothi (1939 film), a Tamil film
 Jyothi (1976 film), a Telugu film
 Jyoti (1981 film), a Hindi film
 Jyoti (1988 film), a Bengali film
 Jothi (2022 film), a Tamil film
 Jyoti (TV series), an Indian daily soap opera on Imagine TV
 Jothi (TV series),  a 2021 Indian supernatural fantasy thriller Tamil language television series

Hinduism
 Jyoti (goddess), considered to be a Hindu goddess of light
 Jyotirlinga, a set of consecrated Shiva lingams
 Jyotir Math, one of four major Ādi Śaṅkara schools
 Jyoti Kalash, a light festival associated with Durga

Places
 Jyotirmath, city in Uttarakhand, India
 Jyoti Khuria, municipality in Uttarakhand, India
 Jyothi Central High School, in Ekma, Chhapra, Bihar, India
 Jyothy Kendriya Vidyalaya, an English medium school in Bangalore

People with the name

People in film
 Jyoti Kapur Das, Indian director and screenwriter
 Jyoti Sarup (born 1954), Indian director and producer
 Jyoti Swaroop (died 1991), Indian director
 J. P. Dutta (born 1949), Indian producer, writer and director
 Jyothi (actress, born 1963) (1963–2007), film actress who acted in over 50 South Indian films
 Jyothi (Telugu actress), Indian actress and Bigg Boss Telugu contestant
 Jyothika (born 1977), Indian actress of predominantly Tamil films
 Jyoti Gauba, Indian actress 
 Jyothi Lakshmi (1948–2016), Indian actress
 Jyoti Singh (actress), US born Indian actress
 Jyotii Sethi, Indian actress
 Jyoti Subhash, Indian actress

People in sports
 Jyothi Yarraji (born 1999), Indian woman hurdler
 Jyoti (wrestler) (born 1985), Indian wrestler in the -75 kg category
 Jyoti Chetty (born 1982), South African fencer
 Jyoti Dutta (1926–2010), Indian cricketer
 Jyoti Raj, Indian free solo climber
 Jyoti Randhawa (born 1972), Indian professional golfer
 Jyoti Sunita Kullu (born 1978), Indian field hockey player
 Jyoti Yadav (born 1983), Indian cricketer
 Jyoti (field hockey), Indian field hockey player

People in music
 Georgia Anne Muldrow, American musician who occasionally goes by the stage name Jyoti
 Jyoti Ghimire, Nepalese musician
 Jyoti Goho, Indian classical musician
 Jyoti Hegde, Indian classical musician
 Jyoti Nooran, one of the Nooran Sisters

People in government
 Jyoti Basu (1914–2010), male Indian politician, of Communist Party of India (Marxist) from West Bengal, India
 Jyoti Devi, Indian politician
 Jyoti Dhurve, Indian politician
 Jyoti Kalani, Indian politician
 Jyoti Kiran (born 1968), Indian politician of the BJP party
 Jyoti Mirdha (born 1972), Indian politician
 Jyoti Prakash Nirala (1986–2017), Indian Air Force member killed in action
 Jyoti Prasad Das, Indian politician
 Jyoti Prasad Rajkhowa, Indian governor
 Jyotiraditya Scindia, Indian politician
 Jyoti Singh (judge), Delhi High Court judge
 Jothi Venkatachalam (born 1917), female Indian politician, former Governor of Kerala, India

People in literature
 Jyotirmoyee Devi (1896–1988), Indian writer
 Jyoti Mhapsekar (born 1950), librarian and activist
 Jyoti Prakash Dutta (writer), Bangladeshi short-story writer
 Jyoti Prasad Agarwala (1903–1951), prolific author of Assamese literature

Other people
 Jyotirao Phule (1827–1890), activist and writer
 Jyoti Amge (born 1993), world's smallest woman as of 2018
 Jyoti Dhawale, HIV activist
 Jyotirmoy Dey (1955–2011), journalist and investigator
 Jyoti Kumari (born 2005), student known for bicycling over 700 mi during COVID-19 lockdown
 Jyotiprasad Medhi (1924–2017), statistical mathematician
 Jyoti Rout (born 1965), Indian classical dancer
 Jyotiranjan Srichandan Ray (born 1970), Indian geochemist
 Jyoti Prakash Tamang (born 1961), Indian food technologist
 Jyoti Singh, 2012 Delhi gang rape murder victim

Other uses
 Jyothi (album), a 1983 album by Charlie Mariano and the Karnataka College of Percussion
 Andhra Jyothi, Indian newspaper
 Jothi Agaval (The Call Divine), a poem by Ramalinga Swamigal (Vallalar)
 Jyoti swarupini, a Carnatic raga

See also
 Jyoti Basu (disambiguation)